Events in the year 1937 in Germany.

Incumbents

National level
Head of State and Chancellor

 Adolf Hitler (the Führer) (Nazi Party)

Events

 10 March — The Encyclical Mit brennender Sorge of Pope Pius XI is published in Nazi Germany.
 6 May — Hindenburg disaster: In the United States, the German airship Hindenburg bursts into flame when mooring to a mast in Lakehurst, New Jersey. Thirteen passengers, 22 crew and one member of the ground crew were killed.
 7 May — Spanish Civil War: The German Condor Legion Fighter Group, equipped with Heinkel He 51 biplanes, arrives in Spain to assist Francisco Franco's forces.
 28 May — Volkswagen, state-owned carmaker, is formed to produce the new people's car.
 8 June — Carl Orff's Carmina Burana premieres in Frankfurt, Germany.
 18 July - Haus der Kunst in Munich opened
 20 July — The Geibeltbad Pirna is opened in Dresden, Germany.
 6-13 September — The 9th Nazi Party Congress is held and titled the "Rally of Labour" (Reichsparteitag der Arbeit) to highlight the reduction of unemployment in Germany since the Nazi rise to power.
 13 October — Germany, in a note to Brussels, guarantees the inviolability and integrity of Belgium so long as the latter abstains from military action against Germany
 5 November — In the Reich Chancellery, Adolf Hitler holds a secret meeting and states his plans for acquiring "living space" for the German people (recorded in the Hossbach Memorandum)
 16 November — Sabena OO-AUB Ostend crash
 Date unknown — Otto Bayer and his coworkers at IG Farben in Leverkusen first made polyurethanes.
 Date unknown — The opioid Methadone is synthesized in Germany by scientists Max Bockmühl and Gustav Ehrhart.
 Date unknown — Konrad Zuse submits patents in Germany based on his Z1 computer design anticipating von Neumann architecture.

Births
 2 January — Martin Lauer, German sprinter (died 2019)
 15 January — Walter Stöhrer, German painter (died 2000)
 31 January — Hans Dresig, Professor for Applied mechanics and Theory of Mechanisms and Machines (died 2018)
 8 February — Manfred Krug, German actor (died 2016)
 13 February — Sigmund Jähn, German cosmonaut and pilot (died 2019)
 17 February — Rita Süssmuth, German politician (CDU) 
 20 February — Robert Huber, German biochemist and Nobel laureate
 22 February — Rolf Schafstall, German footballer (died 2018)
 18 March — Rudi Altig, German cyclist (died 2016)
 19 March — Egon Krenz, German politician
 20 March — Helmut Recknagel, German ski jumper
 22 March — Armin Hary, German sprinter
 2 April — Alexandra Kluge, German actress (died 2017)
 3 April — Annekathrin Bürger, German actress
 25 April — Wolfgang Zapf, German sociologe (died 2018)
 24 April — Otmar Gutmann, German TV producer, animator and director (died 1993)
 2 May – Gisela Elsner, German writer (died 1992)
 3 May – Hans Cieslarczyk, German football player (died 2020)
 23 May — Rupert Scholz, German politician
 29 May — Alwin Schockemöhle, German equestrian
 14 June — Hans-Ulrich Klose, German politician
 24 June — Hans Tiedge, German spy (died 2011)
 25 June — Karin Grasshof, German judge
 1 July – Claus-Wilhelm Canaris, German jurist (died 2021)
 4 July – Wolf von Lojewski, German television journalist
 5 July — Anke Fuchs, German politician (died 2019)
 7 July — Konrad Wirnhier, German sport shooter (died 2002)
 12 July - Helga Mees, German fencer (died 2014)
 16 August — Gerhard Pohl, German politician (died 2012)
 20 August — Georg Thoma, German skier
 7 September - Birgit Breuel, German politician
 1 October — Everhardt Franßen, German judge
 13 October — Rudolf Seiters, German politician
 27 October — Peter Lustig, German television presenter and author of children's books (died 2016)
 26 July – Peter Fleischmann, German film director (died 2021)
 29 October — Michael Ponti, German pianist (died 2022)
 1 November — Witta Pohl, German actress (died 2011)
 11 November – Marlene Schmidt, German actress and beauty queen
 16 November – Lothar Späth, German politician (died 2016)
 20 November - René Kollo, German tenor
 23 November - Karl Mildenberger, German boxer (died 2018)
 26 November - Bruno Steinhoff, German businessman
 29 November - Jo Brauner, German journalist
 20 December - Manfred Lahnstein, German politician
 29 December — Dieter Thomas Heck, German actor (died 2018)
 31 December - Paul Spiegel, President of Central Council of Jews in Germany (died 2006)

Deaths 
 4 January – Paul Behncke, German admiral (born 1869)
 11 February – Adolf Gaston Eugen Fick, German ophthalmologist  (born 1852)
 12 March — Julius Geppert, German pharmacologist (born 1856)
 18 March — Felix Graf von Bothmer, German general (born 1852)
 18 April – Max von Gallwitz, German general (born 1852)
 7 May – Ernst A. Lehmann, German captain of the Hindenburg (b. 1886)
 14 July – Walter Simons, German diplomat (born 1861)	
 30 July - Hans von Rosenberg, German diplomat and politician (born 1874)
 29 September – Ernst Hoppenberg, German swimmer (born 1878)
 7 October - Renate Müller, German actress and singer (born 1906)
 9 October - Ernest Louis, Grand Duke of Hesse (born 1868)
 10 October – Walter Gronostay, German composer (born 1906)
 27 November — Wilhelm Weinberg, German physician and geneticist (born 1862)
 12 December - Alfred Abel, German actor (born 1879)
 20 December  - Erich Ludendorff, German general (born 1865)

References

 
Years of the 20th century in Germany
Germany
Germany